Nikola Radičević (born 25 April 1994) is a Serbian professional basketball player for Bilbao of the Spanish Liga ACB.

Early career
Born in Čačak, Radičević began his playing career with Belgrade-based Partizan's youth system.

Professional career
In 2012, Radičević moved to Baloncesto Sevilla of the Spanish Liga ACB, signing with the club for five seasons. He trained with the club's first team, while also playing with the club's youth team in the Liga EBA (Spanish 4th Division), as well as with the club's first team. For the 2014–15 season, he finally secured a permanent spot in Sevilla's first team.

On 1 August 2017, Radičević signed a three-year deal with Serbian team Crvena zvezda. On 22 January 2018, he left Crvena zvezda and signed with Gran Canaria.

On 8 August 2018, Radičević signed a three-year deal with the Italian club Aquila Basket Trento.

On 14 November 2018, he signed with Gran Canaria of the Liga ACB. 

On 9 February 2020, he signed with UCAM Murcia of the Liga ACB. On 10 October 2020, he signed with Greek club Promitheas Patras.

On 26 February 2021, Radičević signed with Trefl Sopot of the Polish Basketball League.

On June 29, 2021, he signed with Lietkabelis of the Lithuanian Basketball League (LKL).

On June 28, 2022, he signed with Bilbao of the Spanish Liga ACB.

NBA draft rights
On 25 June 2015, Radičević was drafted with the 57th overall pick of the 2015 NBA draft by the Denver Nuggets. He played for the Nuggets during 2017 NBA Summer League. On 22 November 2020, his draft rights were traded to the Detroit Pistons. On 11 July 2022, his draft rights were traded to the New York Knicks.

National team
After averaging 12.4 points, 2.9 rebounds and 5.1 assists per game, Radičević was named to the All-Tournament Team of the 2012 FIBA Europe Under-18 Championship.

References

External links
 Nikola Radičević at acb.com 
 Nikola Radičević at draftexpress.com
 Nikola Radičević at eurobasket.com
 Nikola Radičević at euroleague.net
 Nikola Radičević at fiba.com (archive)
 Nikola Radičević at fibaeurope.com

1994 births
Living people
ABA League players
Aquila Basket Trento players
Basketball players from Čačak
Bilbao Basket players
BC Lietkabelis players
CB Gran Canaria players
CB Murcia players
Real Betis Baloncesto players
Denver Nuggets draft picks
KK Crvena zvezda players
Lega Basket Serie A players
Liga ACB players
Point guards
Serbian expatriate basketball people in Italy
Serbian expatriate basketball people in Lithuania
Serbian expatriate basketball people in Spain
Serbian men's basketball players
Trefl Sopot players